Haysboro is a residential neighbourhood in the southwest quadrant of Calgary, Alberta. It is bounded by Heritage Drive to the north, Macleod Trail to the east, 98th Avenue (an alley north of Southland Drive) to the south and 14 Street W and the Glenmore Reservoir to the west. It is bisected by Elbow Drive.

The land comprising Haysboro was annexed by the City of Calgary in 1956 and the community was established in 1958. The land comprising the neighbourhood was originally a dairy farm owned by future Calgary Mayor, Member of Parliament and Senator Harry Hays, who would sell the land in 1959 to developers in part to fund his campaign for mayor. Haysboro is represented on Calgary City Council by the councillor for Ward 11.

Demographics

Residents in this community had a median household income of $52,261 in 2000, and there were 10.4% low income residents living in the neighbourhood. As of 2000, 19.3% of the residents were immigrants. A proportion of 33.5% of the buildings were condominiums or apartments, and 23.9% of the housing was used for renting.

Education
The community is served by Akiva Academy, Haysboro Elementary and Woodman Junior High public schools, as well as STEM Innovation Academy and Our Lady of the Rockies High School (Catholic). Eugene Coste elementary is a Spanish immersion school

See also
List of neighbourhoods in Calgary
Harry Hays

References

External links
Haysboro Community Association

 

Neighbourhoods in Calgary